Tünde Szabó (born 8 February 1989) is a Hungarian long distance runner. She placed 83rd in the marathon at the 2016 Olympics.

References

External links

 
 
 
 
 

1989 births
Living people
Hungarian female long-distance runners
Hungarian female marathon runners
Place of birth missing (living people)
Athletes (track and field) at the 2016 Summer Olympics
Olympic athletes of Hungary